Karl Friedrich Griffin Dawes (5 January 1861 – 8 April 1941) was a Norwegian naval officer and politician for the Liberal Party. He is best known as the Norwegian Minister of Defence from 1907 to 1908.

Career
He was born in Fredrikstad as the son of engineer and merchant Henry Dawes and his wife Caroline Griffin. He started on a career in the military, graduating from the Norwegian Naval Academy in 1884 and the Military College in 1885. He was promoted successively to second lieutenant in 1882, premier lieutenant in 1885, captain in 1894, captain commander in 1900 and commander in 1903. From 1895 to 1901 he worked in the Ministry of Defence, and from 1901 to 1902 he stayed in Horten. He was a member of Kristiania city council for the term 1898–1901, and was elected to Horten city council in 1901.

From 1902 to 1910 he was the director of the Norwegian Naval Academy, except for the years 1907 to 1908. On 23 October 1907, when the Løvland cabinet assumed office, he was appointed as the new Minister of Defence. He held this position until 18 March 1908, when the cabinet fell. In 1910 he reached the rank of rear admiral. As such he was responsible for the Royal Norwegian Navy Neutrality Guard during World War I, helping to keep Norway out of the war. He died in April 1941.

References

1861 births
1941 deaths
Royal Norwegian Naval Academy alumni
Academic staff of the Royal Norwegian Naval Academy
Royal Norwegian Navy admirals
Liberal Party (Norway) politicians
Politicians from Oslo
People from Fredrikstad
People from Horten
Norwegian people of British descent
Defence ministers of Norway